The 2020–21 Basketball Championship of Bosnia and Herzegovina was the 20th season of this championship, with 14 teams from Bosnia and Herzegovina participating in it. Igokea was the defending champion.

Competition format 
Thirteen of fourteen teams joined the regular season, played with as double round-robin tournament.

At the end of regular season the last three teams would be relegated, while the first five teams would join "Liga 6" along with KK Igokea. First four teams in "Liga 6" would compete in playoff tournament, with one-leg (semifinals, third place and final) matches.

In mid-season, however, it was decided that only the last team will be relegated. Also, playoff semifinal and final will be played in best of three and best of five format, respectively.

Distribution
The following is the access list for this season.

Teams and locations 

Bosna Royal, Borac Banja Luka and Čelik Zenica were promoted, while Vogošća was relegated.

Regular season

Standings

Liga 6

Playoffs

Igokea, which was supposed to host the Final Four, canceled the organization of this tournament, and the Basketball Association of BiH awarded the organization to Široki.
Igokea, Borac and Spars did not show up to the final tournament, and as a result the title was awarded to Široki as a walkover.

Igokea, Borac and Spars were fined, and relegated to a lower tier competition.

Clubs in European competitions

References 

Basketball Championship of Bosnia and Herzegovina
Bosnia
Bas